The manga series Bokurano: Ours is written and illustrated by Mohiro Kitoh. The first chapter premiered in the January 2004 issue of the monthly seinen manga magazine Ikki, where it was serialized until its conclusion in the August 2009 issue. Its chapters were collected in eleven tankōbon volumes published by Shogakukan. It is about a group of middle-school students who unwillingly assume the task of piloting a giant mecha named Zearth in a series of battles against mechas from parallel worlds, where the survival of Earth is dependent on their continuing to win at the cost of the life of the pilot of each battle.

The manga is licensed for an English-language release by Viz Media, which began serializing it in the online English version of Ikki on July 23, 2009; the first print volume was scheduled to be published in February 2010. It is also licensed in French by Asuka, in Italian by Kappa Edizioni, in South Korea by Daiwon C.I., and in Taiwan by Ever Glory Publishing.

Volume list

See also
 List of Bokurano characters
 List of Bokurano episodes

References

External links
 Official Ikki Paradise Bokura no website
 

Bokurano: Ours

fr:Liste des chapitres et épisodes de Bokurano